How Was Tomorrow is the third album by Canadian singer-songwriters The Cash Brothers.  The album features alt-country and alt-folk ballads with vocal harmonies, accompanied by acoustic and some electric guitar work.

History
In 1997 the Andrew and Peter Cash began writing and performing songs. They recorded their music at Chess Records, and in 1999 they released an album, Raceway on their own label, Four Court Records.  After the brothers had released a second album in 2000, Raceway came to the attention of Rounder Records.  The album was updated and re-released in 2001 on Zoe/Rounder Records in the US and in Europe under the title How was Tomorrow.

The pair toured with a backup band in the UK, Netherlands and the US in support of the album. The touring musicians were Gord Tough on electric guitar, drummer Randy Curnew, bassist Paul Taylor and keyboardist Todd Lumley.

Critical reception
The album was generally well received. Reviews of the album praised the duo's harmonies, innovative guitar work and songwriting.

Track listing

References

2003 albums
The Cash Brothers albums